Of Worlds Beyond is a collection of essays about the techniques of writing science fiction, edited by Lloyd Arthur Eshbach. It was first published in 1947 by Fantasy Press in an edition of 1,262 copies.  It has been reprinted by Advent in 1964 and by Dobson in 1965.

Contents
 Introduction, by Lloyd Arthur Eshbach
 "On the Writing of Speculative Fiction", by Robert A. Heinlein
 "Writing a Science Novel", by Dr. Eric Temple Bell
 "The Logic of Fantasy", by Jack Williamson
 "Complication in the Science Fiction Story", by A. E. van Vogt
 "Humor in Science Fiction", by L. Sprague de Camp
 "The Epic of Space", by E. E. Smith, Ph.D.
 "The Science of Science Fiction Writing", by John W. Campbell, Jr.

References

1947 non-fiction books
1947 anthologies
Essay anthologies
Science fiction studies
Books about writing
Fantasy Press books